Jasmine Hyde  is an English actress who has appeared on the stage radio and screen. She is best known for her role as the young Hilda Rumpole in many years of the BBC Radio 4 dramatisations of Rumpole of the Bailey, opposite Benedict Cumberbatch and then later, Julian Rhind-Tutt, including Rumpole and the Penge Bungalow Murders. Most recently she appeared as Anna in The Arcola's production of 'The Cutting Edge' written and directed by Jack Shepherd.

In 2017 she played the lead role in Gary Sinyor’s psychological thriller The Unseen.

Career
Jasmine Hyde graduated from RADA in 2000. She won the BBC Carleton Hobbs Award for Radio in 2000/2001. resulting in a contract on the BBC radio drama rep company as her first job.

Film

In May 2017, she appeared as Bella in Matt Parvin's JAM opposite former Harry Potter actor Harry Melling.

Television
Hyde played the part of Pippa Crerar, a political journalist working for the Daily Mirror newspaper, in the Sky UK drama This England, broadcast in October 2022.

Theatre

Her first theatre job was playing Madeleine in the Paines Plough/Frantic Assembly production of Abi Morgan's 'Tiny Dynamite' directed by Vicky Featherstone in 2001. She then moved to the Royal National Theatre to appear in Tom Stoppard’s trilogy ’The Coast of Utopia’ directed by Sir Trevor Nunn.

Personal life
Jasmine Hyde is married and has a son.

Radio

Notes

External links
https://www.femalefirst.co.uk/movies/jasmine-hyde-exclusive-interview-the-unseen-1114038.html

English radio actresses
English stage actresses
English television actresses
Living people
Alumni of RADA
Year of birth missing (living people)